Thrapsathiri is a white Greek wine grape variety that abounds in Crete.
The grape is highly resistant to drought, ripens late and produces very aromatic wines with soft acidity.
In the past, trapsathiri used to be blended with vilana, but nowadays it is increasingly vinified on its own.

Thrapsathiri used to be considered a clone of athiri.
However, DNA analysis has suggested that it is a distinct variety with links to vidiano.
It has also been suggested that thrapsathiri is identical to begleri of Cyclades.

References

External links
Thrapsathiri

Grape varieties of Greece
White wine grape varieties